Black Eagles is a term describing a series of Colombian drug trafficking, right-wing, counter-revolutionary, paramilitary organizations made up of new and preexisting paramilitary forces, who emerged from the failures of the demobilization process between 2004 and 2006, which aimed to disarm the United Self-Defense Units of Colombia (AUC).

The Black Eagles were first considered to be a third generation of paramilitary groups, but Colombian military reports suggest they are intermediaries in the drug business between the guerrilla and drug cartels outside Colombia. As of 2007, they were reported active in the city of Barrancabermeja.

Origins
The Black Eagles first appeared in the Norte de Santander area in 2006. On 18 October 2006, President Álvaro Uribe openly ordered their detention. The government ordered the creation of a new Search Bloc against the Black Eagles and classified them as a gang of former paramilitaries.

The Black Eagles are one of a number of groups formed following the demilitarisation of the AUC, and are said to be closely linked with the Usuga Clan drug cartel and right-wing neo-paramilitary group.

Drugs
The Black Eagles are closely associated with drug cartels and are involved in drug trafficking activities, extortion, racketeering and kidnapping. They have also attacked guerrilla members and suspected sympathizers. One individual accused of leading the Black Eagles was former AUC leader Vicente Castaño. Castaño later disappeared, believed to have been assassinated on the orders of Diego Murillo Bejarano in retaliation for taking control of his territory and criminal rackets.

Groups
 Los Rastrojos: operating in Cauca and Valle del Cauca. (Approximately 1200 members).
 Mano Negra: operating in Putumayo. (Unknown number of members)

References

External links
Colombia Reports: Aguilas Negras profile

Organizations established in 2006
2006 establishments in Colombia
Organizations disestablished in 2011
2011 disestablishments in Colombia
Disbanded Colombian drug cartels
Paramilitary organisations based in Colombia
Far-right politics
Anti-communist terrorism
Bacrims
Anti-communist organizations